Hubbells is an unincorporated community in Butler County, in the U.S. state of Missouri.

The community was named after the proprietor of a local mill.

References

Unincorporated communities in Butler County, Missouri
Unincorporated communities in Missouri